Mount Khmyznikov is a peak,  high, in the northern part of the Skeidsnutane Peaks, Betekhtin Range, in the Humboldt Mountains of Queen Maud Land, Antarctica. It was discovered and plotted from air photos by the Third German Antarctic Expedition, 1938–39. It was mapped from air photos and surveys by the Sixth Norwegian Antarctic Expedition, 1956–60, remapped by the Soviet Antarctic Expedition, 1960–61, and named after Soviet hydrographer P.K. Khmyznikov.

References

Mountains of Queen Maud Land
Humboldt Mountains (Antarctica)